W. A. Vines High School (commonly Vines or VHS) is a free co-educational secondary school in Plano, Texas (USA) serving grades nine and ten. Wilson and Haggard middle schools feed into Vines. Founded in 1976, the school is part of the Plano Independent School District, which is accredited by the Texas Education Agency. The school colors are purple and white, and the school mascot is the Viking. Vines is one of six high schools in PISD, and is one of two that feed into Plano Senior High School.

History
Vines High School was built on the former farmland of William Asa Vines, director of the Plano National Bank.

Academics
Vines now offers four Advanced Placement (AP) classes: Human Geography, European History, Principles of, Computer Science, and World History.

References

External links
 Official Website

High schools in Plano, Texas
Plano Independent School District high schools
Educational institutions established in 1976
1976 establishments in Texas